Boroo Gold Mine is an open-pit gold mining site in Mongolia located about 110 km (70 mi) west-northwest of the capital Ulaanbaatar in Bayangol and Mandal sums (districts) of Selenge Province in northern Mongolia. Gatsuurt Gold Mine is 35 E from Boroo Gold Mine.

Boroo was owned by the Canadian mining company, Centerra Gold Inc. It began commercial production in March 2004 and produced more than 1.5 million ounces (46 tons) of gold through the end of 2010. The Boroo mine was the first hard-rock gold mine established in Mongolia and the largest foreign investment in the country at the time it began production. Boroo is estimated to have increased the entire country's GDP by 5–7 %.

On October 12, 2018 Centerra Gold sold its Mongolian business unit (including the Boroo project and related infrastructure as well as the Gatsuurt development property) to OZD ASIA PTE Ltd., a private Singapore based company.

References and external links

 Boroo Gold Mongolia
 Boroo Gold sale to OZD Asia

2004 establishments in Asia
Gold mines in Mongolia
Open-pit mines
Selenge Province
Surface mines in Mongolia